In the 2013–14 season, Al Shorta competed in the 2013–14 Iraqi Premier League and the 2014 AFC Cup after failing to qualify for the 2014 AFC Champions League group stage. They finished in first place in the Iraqi Premier League for the second time in a row, finishing one point ahead of second-placed Arbil FC, however were not crowned champions due to the season ending prematurely and were only considered as champions for the purpose of enabling admission into the AFC Cup. They also played in the AFC Cup but failed to advance past the group stages, playing out four goalless draws out of six games.

The season saw the club appoint their third ever foreign coach, Brazilian Lorival Santos, and sign their first ever Brazilian player, striker Cristiano da Silva Santos. Their top scorer for the season was Iraqi forward Mustafa Karim who scored seven goals in total.

Squad

Out on loan

 (at Al Zawraa until the end of the 2013-14 season)
 (at Al Masafi until the end of the 2013-14 season)

Departed during season

Backroom staff and club officials

Boardroom positions

Kit
Supplier: Nike / Sponsor: Royal Arena Sport

Transfers

In

Out

Matches

Pre-season friendlies

Mid-season friendlies

Competitive

Iraqi Premier League

Classification

Results summary

AFC Champions League

AFC Cup

Group stage

Last updated: 15 May 2014Source: Al Shorta website

Player statistics

Iraqi Premier League

AFC Cup

References

External links
Al Shorta website
Al Shorta TV
Team info at goalzz.com

Al-Shorta SC seasons
Al Shorta